Anniyur Abathsahayeswarar Temple (பொன்னூர் ஆபத்சகாயேசுவரர் கோயில்) is a Hindu temple located at Ponnur in Mayiladuthurai  district of Tamil Nadu, India. The historical name of the place is  Tiru Anniyur.  The presiding deity is Shiva. He is called as Abathsahayeswarar. His consort is known as  Perianayaki.

Significance 

It is one of the shrines of the 275 Paadal Petra Sthalams - Shiva Sthalams glorified in the early medieval Tevaram poems by Tamil Saivite Nayanars Tirugnanasambandar and Tirunavukkarasar.

Literary mention 
Gnanasambandar describes the feature of the deity of Anniyur as:

References

External links 
 
 

Shiva temples in Mayiladuthurai district
Padal Petra Stalam